The 66th Infantry Regiment is an infantry regiment in the United States Army.

History
For a brief period (1932-1940), the 66th Armored Regiment was designated as the 66th Infantry Regiment. The second iteration of the 66th Infantry Regiment was not descended from this organization.

Lineage
Constituted 10 July 1943 in the Regular Army as the 66th Infantry and assigned to the 71st Infantry Division. Activated 15 July 1943 at Camp Carson, Colorado. Inactivated 5–9 April 1946 at Camp Kilmer, New Jersey.
Relieved from the 71st Division and allotted to the Regular Army 25 February 1953; Concurrently broken up and elements redesignated as elements of the 13th Armored Division as follows
 66th Infantry (less 1st, 2nd, and 3rd Battalions) as the 266th Armored Infantry Battalion.
 1st Battalion as the 267th Armored Infantry Battalion
 2nd Battalion as the 268th Armored Infantry Battalion
 3rd Battalion as the 269th Armored Infantry Battalion

Campaign streamers
World War II
 Rhineland
 Central Europe

References

066